The Muderis Ali Efendi Mosque, also named Mosque of Ali Hoxha, is a mosque in Prizren, Kosovo. 
Built between 1543 and 1581, it is one of the oldest mosques in Kosovo. It is situated on the street "Rr. Papa Gjon Pali" down the hill from the Catholic Cathedral of Prizren, with its triangle shaped space it occupies 877 m 2, it was declared by Prizren Municipality in 1989 as a cultural monument.
Its founder, Ali Effendi, who was at that time the Muderis of Prizren is buried in the garden. After the Second World War it was used as a Red Cross center and was heavily damaged because of the improper conduct. In 1963 fire broke out and thus damaged the Mosque even more (according to the city there was a fire in 1975), because of these events it lost its originality of an old monument.  It was famous for the 1908 three year boycott of catholic shops in Prizren.

1905 boycott

The mosque played a central role during the boycott of the Catholic Albanian shops that started in 1905. During this time Muslim population didn't engage in any economic activity with the above-mentioned shops. The cause of this boycott was the alleged finding of pigs head in this Mosque right before the morning prayer. Because the Mosque is situated near the Catholic Church, people thought that it was a provocation of the Catholic Albanians and in coordination with the Main Imam took decision to boycott the Catholic Enterprises. It has been later speculated proven that this was a provocation which had been  organized by the Serbian Rector of the Bogoslovija Orthodox Church School, in order to divide the Albanians who at that time were fighting for the independence from the Ottoman Empire.

Picture gallery

See also 
List of mosques in Kosovo

Notes

References

Bibliography 
https://books.google.com/books?id=GCRjKdrmqqEC Kosovo  By Gail Warrander, Verena Knaus
Historijsko Geografska Analiza urbanih funkcija Prizrena by Dr. Esat Haskuka
Prizreni i Lashte - Morfologjia e ecurive per ruajtjen e kultures materiale by Muhamed Shukriu

External links 

Mosques in Prizren
Ottoman mosques in Kosovo
1581 establishments in the Ottoman Empire
16th-century mosques
Mosques completed in 1581
Cultural heritage monuments in Prizren District